Adrian Township is a township in LaMoure County in the U.S. state of North Dakota. Its population at the 2010 U.S. Census was 99.  Its population at the 2000 Census was 110.

References

External links
A history of Adrian ; Adrian, North Dakota 1885-1985 from the Digital Horizons website

Townships in LaMoure County, North Dakota
Townships in North Dakota